The Vancouver Regiment was an infantry regiment of the Non-Permanent Active Militia of the Canadian Militia (now the Canadian Army). The regiment was formed in 1924 when the 1st British Columbia Regiment (Duke of Connaught's Own) was Reorganized into three separate regiments. In 1936, the regiment was Amalgamated with The Irish Fusiliers of Canada to form The Irish Fusiliers of Canada (The Vancouver Regiment) (now part of The British Columbia Regiment (Duke of Connaught's Own)).

Lineage of the Vancouver Regiment 

 Originated on 15 May, 1924, in Vancouver, British Columbia, when the 1st British Columbia Regiment (Duke of Connaught's Own) was Reorganized into three separate regiments: the 1st British Columbia Regiment (Duke of Connaught's Own), The Westminster Regiment; and The Vancouver Regiment.
 Amalgamated on 1 June, 1936, with The Irish Fusiliers of Canada and Redesignated as the Irish Fusiliers (Vancouver Regiment) (later The Irish Fusiliers of Canada (Vancouver Regiment)).

Perpetuations 

 29th Battalion, (Vancouver), CEF
 158th Battalion (The Duke of Connaught's Own), CEF

Organization 
The Vancouver Regiment (15 May, 1924)

 1st Battalion (redesignation of the 2nd Battalion, 1st British Columbia Regiment - perpetuating the 29th Battalion, CEF)
 2nd (Reserve) Battalion (redesignation of the 5th Battalion, 1st British Columbia Regiment - perpetuating the 158th Battalion, CEF)

Battle honours 

 Mount Sorrel
 Somme, 1916, '18
 Flers-Courcelette
 Thiepval
 Ancre Heights
 Arras, 1917, '18
 Vimy, 1917
 Scarpe, 1917, '18
 Hill 70
 Ypres, 1917
 Passchendaele
 Amiens
 Drocourt-Quéant
 Hindenburg Line
 Canal du Nord
 Cambrai, 1918
 Pursuit to Mons
 France and Flanders, 1915–18

Notes and references 

Irish Fusiliers of Canada (The Vancouver Regiment)
Military units and formations of British Columbia
Military units and formations disestablished in 1936